Human Remains was an American grindcore band, formed in 1989 in New Jersey. The band featured the vocalist Paul Miller, the guitarists Steve Procopio and James Baglino, as well as the drummer Dave Witte, who is also known for his work for Discordance Axis, Burnt by the Sun, and Atomsmasher. The band's most notable release, Using Sickness as a Hero EP, was released by Relapse Records in 1996. A compilation album featuring the band's entire discography, Where Were You When: 1989-1995, was also released in 2002.

The band was known for its "unusual and cliché-free" approach to songwriting, as well as grindcore, hardcore, and death metal-blending sound, which was influential in the development of experimental edges of the grindcore, death metal and noisecore scenes.

Band members
 Paul Miller – vocals
 Steve Procopio – guitar
 Jim Baglino – guitar
 Teddy Patterson III – bass (1989–94)
 William Carl Black – bass (1994–95)
 Dave Witte – drums

Discography
Extended plays
 Admirations Most Deep and Foul (1992)
 When Forever Becomes Until... (1995)
 Using Sickness as a Hero (1996)

Compilation albums
 Where Were You When (2002)

Demos
 1990 Demo (1990)
 1992 Demo (1992)

References

External links

American grindcore musical groups
American death metal musical groups
Musical quintets
Heavy metal musical groups from New Jersey
Musical groups established in 1989
Musical groups disestablished in 1995